Älvängen (earlier Elfängen) is a locality situated in Ale Municipality, Västra Götaland County, Sweden. It had 4,196 inhabitants in 2010. Among the churches of Älvängen are the Älvängen Church and the Starrkärr Church .

Älvängen was the hometown of the painter and writer Ivar Arosenius. The football player Pontus Dahlberg was born and raised in Älvängen.

The P A Carlmarks rope factory was located to Älvängen. , there is a museum in the old factory locals that shows the rope productions in the early beginning of the 20th century. The museum also produced the rope for the East Indiaman Götheborg.

Notable people
 Martin "Rekkles" Larsson, professional League of Legends player for Fnatic
 Pontus Dahlberg, football player for IFK Göteborg.

References

External links
Webpage of the Rope Factory

Populated places in Västra Götaland County
Populated places in Ale Municipality